Dactylorhiza russowii is a species of Dactylorhiza.

It is native to the areas from East Germany to Central Russia.

References

External links

russowii
Flora of Europe
Flora of Asia